Shuangsi(Double Creeks) can refer to either:

 Shuangsi Township, a township in North Taiwan
 Shuangsi Tropical Viviparous Forest, a forest reserve in South Taiwan